Jim Dobson may refer to:
James Dobson, a.k.a. Jim Dobson, American evangelical Christian psychologist and founder of Focus on the Family
James Murray Dobson (1846–1924), British, a principal engineer of the Buenos Aires harbour works in the late 1880s
Jim Dobson (ice hockey) (born 1960), hockey player
Jim Dobson (baseball) (1939–2018)
James Dobson (actor), American actor